Thai pancake may refer to several dishes from Thailand:
 Khanom bueang
 Khanom khrok
 Kuih cucur
 Roti